Aloe somaliensis, the Somalian aloe, is a species of flowering plant in the family Asphodelaceae.

This plant forms a rosette of broad leaves with striking variable zigzag markings, pink or brown spines, and pink or red flowers to 60 cm in late summer.

In temperate regions it can be grown outside in a sheltered, sunny spot, but requires the protection of glass in the winter. It has gained the Royal Horticultural Society’s Award of Garden Merit.

References

somaliensis
Taxa named by William Watson (botanist)